The 2020 Wisconsin Badgers football team represented the University of Wisconsin–Madison in the 2020 NCAA Division I FBS football season. The Badgers were led by sixth-year head coach Paul Chryst and competed as members of the West Division of the Big Ten Conference. They played their home games at Camp Randall Stadium in Madison, Wisconsin.

On August 11, 2020, the Big Ten Conference suspended all fall sports competitions due to the COVID-19 pandemic. However, on September 16, the Big Ten reinstated the season, announcing an eight-game season beginning on October 24.

Previous season
The 2019 team started the year nineteenth in the pre-season AP Poll. The team finished with two regular season losses, and were invited to the Rose Bowl for the first time since 2012 to play Oregon. The Badgers lost the game and finished the year at 10–4 and top 10 in final polls.

Offseason

2020 NFL Draft

Transfers

Preseason

Spring game
The Badgers spring scrimmage and practice on April 18, 2020 was canceled due to the COVID-19 pandemic.

Award watch lists
Listed in the order that they were released

Preseason Big Ten poll
Although the Big Ten Conference has not held an official preseason poll since 2010, Cleveland.com has polled sports journalists representing all member schools as a de facto preseason media poll since 2011. For the 2020 poll, Wisconsin was projected to finish first in the West Division.

Schedule

Games canceled due to COVID-19 pandemic
The Badgers 2020 schedule originally consisted of six home games, four away games, and two neutral site games. The Badgers would have hosted two of its three non-conference games at Camp Randall; the first on September 12 against Southern Illinois from the Missouri Valley, then the next week on September 19, playing Appalachian State, a member of the Sun Belt Conference. The last non-conference matchup on October 3 was a primetime game guaranteed to air on NBC against Notre Dame as part of the Fighting Irish's neutral-site Shamrock Series at Lambeau Field in Green Bay, with Notre Dame as the designated home team.

The Big Ten Conference canceled all non-conference games on July 9 due to the COVID-19 pandemic; the day before, the November 7 away game at Northwestern was moved from the neutral site Wrigley Field in Chicago back to Ryan Field in Evanston. Both Notre Dame and Wisconsin plan to fulfill their contract and play the Lambeau Field game in a subsequent season.

On November 25, Wisconsin's game vs. Minnesota was canceled, leaving the team with only 5 games maximum and thus making the Badgers no longer eligible for the 2020 Big Ten Football Championship Game.

Current schedule
In Big Ten Conference play, Wisconsin will play all members of the West Division, and draws Indiana, and Michigan from the East Division.

*Wisconsin's game with Nebraska was canceled due to a COVID-19 outbreak at Wisconsin. The game will not be rescheduled. Instead, both teams will have a bye and will have just seven games.

*Wisconsin's game with Purdue was cancelled due to a COVID-19 outbreak at Wisconsin. The game will not be rescheduled. Instead, Wisconsin will have a bye and will have just six games, and Purdue will have a bye and will have just seven games.

*Wisconsin's game with Minnesota was initially cancelled due to a COVID-19 outbreak at Wisconsin. The game was eventually rescheduled for Big Ten Championship weekend.

Source:

Roster

Rankings

Game summaries

Illinois

at Nebraska (Cancelled)

The Wisconsin at Nebraska game was canceled due to a COVID-19 outbreak at Wisconsin. The game will not be rescheduled. Instead, both teams will have a bye and will play just seven games.

Purdue (Cancelled)

The Purdue at Wisconsin game was canceled due to a COVID-19 outbreak at Wisconsin. The game will not be rescheduled.

at Michigan

at Northwestern

Minnesota (Rescheduled)

The Minnesota at Wisconsin game was canceled due to a COVID-19 outbreak at Minnesota. The game was rescheduled for December 19 at 3:00 p.m..

Indiana

at Iowa

Minnesota

vs. Wake Forest (Duke's Mayo Bowl)

Awards and honors

Players drafted into the NFL

References

Wisconsin
Wisconsin Badgers football seasons
Duke's Mayo Bowl champion seasons
Wisconsin Badgers football